Novotimoshkino (Yañı Timeşkä) is a rural locality (a village) in Ismagilovsky Selsoviet, Aurgazinsky District, Bashkortostan, Russia. The population was 144 as of 2010. There are 4 streets.

Geography 
Novotimoshkino is located 27 km north of Tolbazy (the district's administrative centre) by road. Nikolskoye is the nearest rural locality.

References 

Rural localities in Aurgazinsky District